Shri Balagangadharanatha Swamiji (18 January 1945 – 13 January 2013) was an  Indian religious leader who was the seer of Adichunchanagiri, Nagamangala Taluk, Mandya district. He was awarded Padma Bhushan, India's third highest civilian honour for the year 2010.

Swamiji was born to Shri Chikkalinge Gowda and Smt. Boramma as Gangadharaiah. He was born in a Kannada Vokkaliga Community (farming community)  He had five siblings - two brothers and three sisters. Shri Gangadharaiah completed his graduation in diploma Science from Government Arts & Science College, Bengaluru. Motivated by the desire to serve God and the people, he chose the spiritual way of life.

Initiated at the age of nineteen, Shri Swamiji spent his initial years mastering the Vedas and other sacred texts under the tutelage of his Guru Shri Ramanandanatha Swamiji.

Shri Shri Shri Balagangadharanatha Mahaswamiji took over as the 71st Pontiff of the ancient Natha Center of Worship, Shri Adichunchanagiri Math, on 24 September 1974 at the age of 30. He was of the line of Shri Bhakthanatha Swamiji, Shri Chandrashekaranatha Swamiji and Shri Ramanandanatha Swamiji of the ‘Natha Pantha’ (Parampara).

Balagangadharanatha Swamiji died on 13 January 2013, five days before his 68th birthday, due to kidney failure. He was undergoing treatment at BGS Global Hospital, under his control, in Kengeri after his blood pressure went out of control during dialysis.

The mutt witnessed a revolutionary progress under his leadership with several of his flagship projects in education, religion and social service. The seer focused on providing humanitarian services including providing basic necessities like food, education and health for lakhs of people during the last four decades.

Awards

See also
Padma Bhushan Awards (2010–2019)
Nirmalananda Swamiji

References

People from Mandya
Recipients of the Padma Bhushan in social work
1945 births
2013 deaths
Deaths from multiple organ failure
Scholars from Karnataka